is a 2007 Japanese film based on the novel of the same name by Shinobu Gotoh. The film is directed by Kazuhiro Yokoyama and stars Tomo Yanagishita as Takumi Hayama and Keisuke Katō as Giichi Saki. The film was released in Japan on December 22, 2007. It is the first movie of five.

Plot

Set at Shidō Academy, a boys' boarding school, the story focuses on Takumi Hayama, a lonely and shy boy who suffers from an extreme phobia of human contact and can not bear being touched by other people. In his second year at school, Takumi is paired in a room with Giichi "Gui" Saki. Gui was brought up abroad and is the school idol with his exceptional academic performance, as well as his good looks. One day, Gui confesses to Takumi that he has been in love with him for some time. This unexpected truth of events unsettles Takumi, however, he comes to realize the true sensitivity of Gui's personality.

Cast
Tomo Yanagishita as Takumi Hayama
Keisuke Katō as Giichi "Gii" Saki
Yasuka Saitō as Izumi Takabayashi
Yukihiro Takiguchi as Shōzō Aikaike
Tetsuya Makita as Daisuke Nozaki
Ryō Sakaguchi as Toshihisa Katakura
Wataru Hatano as Michio Yoshizawa
Hiroki Aiba as Sachi Inoue
Hiroki Kōno as Takumi's Brother
Orie Tōjō as Takumi's Mother

Production
The music was composed by Wanogen. The theme used for the end credits is "Going Under Ground" by Sō Matsumoto.

References

External links
Official web site

2007 films
Boys' love films
Films based on Japanese novels
Films set in Japan
2000s Japanese-language films
Gay-related films
Japanese LGBT-related films
2007 LGBT-related films
2007 romantic drama films
LGBT-related romantic drama films
2000s Japanese films